Prigorje is a geographical subdivision of Croatia, the region around its capital Zagreb, which stretches along the southern slope of Medvednica mountain (colloquially known as "Zagreb's mountain") roughly between Žumberak mountain range and Moslavina region. The term literally means "land by the mountain(s)", "foothills".

References

Regions of Croatia
Geography of Zagreb County